The Basilicata regional election of 1975 took place on 15 June 1975.

Events
Christian Democracy was by far the largest party, largely ahead of the Italian Communist Party, which came distantly second. After the election Vincenzo Verrastro, the incumbent Christian Democratic President, was re-elected president.

Results

Source: Ministry of the Interior

Elections in Basilicata
1975 elections in Italy